The 7th round of the inaugural British Formula 3000 Championship, saw the series visit Silverstone, on 30 July.

Report

Entry
A total of 9 F3000 cars were entered for this, the seventh round of the 1989 British F3000 Championship.

Qualifying
Gary Brabham took pole position for Bromley Motorsport team in their Cosworth-engined Reynard 88D. He was joined on the front row by Roland Ratzenberger in a similar Reynard, prepared by Spirit Motorsport.

Race
The race was held over 40 laps of the Silverstone National circuit. Gary Brabham took the winner spoils for the Bromley Motorsport team, driving their Reynard-Cosworth 88D. The Aussie won in a time of 42:32.21mins., averaging a speed of 107.907 mph. Second place went to championship leader, Andrew Gilbert-Scott in Eddie Jordan Racing’s Reynard-Cosworth 88D, who was only 0.58secs behind. Brabham’s victory moved him to within four points of Gilbert-Scott points leader, with just two rounds to go. Third was poleman, Roland Ratzenberger who completed the podium for the Spirit Motorsport owned by Geoff Mitchell and Tony Searles this Cosworth engined Reynard 88D.

Classification

Race

Class winners in bold

 Fastest lap: Roland Ratzenberger, 1:02.91secs. (109.299 mph)

References

British Formula 3000 Championship